Melaleuca pauperiflora, commonly known as boree, is a plant in the myrtle family, Myrtaceae, and is native to the southern parts of South Australia and Western Australia. It is distinguished by its short, thick leaves and small but profuse heads of white or cream flowers. There are three subspecies.

Description
The tips of the leaves are sometimes blunt, sometimes pointed and sometimes sharp.

The flowers are white to pale yellow and arranged in hemispherical heads, mostly on the ends of branches which continue to grow after flowering but sometimes also in the upper leaf axils. The stamens are arranged in five bundles around the flower, each bundle containing 10 to 18 stamens. Flowering occurs in spring and early summer and is followed by fruit which are woody, barrel-shaped capsules more or less scattered along the branches.

Taxonomy and naming
Melaleuca pauperiflora was first formally described in 1862 by Ferdinand von Mueller in "Fragmenta phytographiae Australiae" from a specimen collected by George Maxwell in the Phillips Range. The specific epithet (pauperiflora) is derived from the Latin words pauper meaning “poor” and flos meaning "flower" or "blossom" referring to the specimen described by Mueller which had only a few flowers.

In a review of the genus Melaleuca in 1988, Bryan Barlow and Kirsten Cowley described three subspecies of Melaleuca pauperiflora:
 Melaleuca pauperiflora subsp. fastigiata occurs in Western Australia between the Wubin, Kulin, Esperance and Norseman districts;
 Melaleuca pauperiflora subsp. mutica occurs in South Australia, especially the Eyre Peninsula, in the Nullarbor Plain and as far east as Murray Bridge;
 Melaleuca pauperiflora subsp. pauperiflora occurs in Western Australia between the South Yilgarn, Ongerup and Salmon Gums districts.

Distribution and habitat
Melaleuca pauperiflora occurs  in the south-west corner of Western Australia and the south of South Australia. It grows in a range of vegetation associations and soils, depending largely on subspecies.

Ecology
Jewel beetles (Family Buprestidae), especially Temognatha heros are important pollinators of Melaleuca pauperiflora.

Conservation
This species is classified as "not threatened" (in Western Australia) by the Government of Western Australia Department of Parks and Wildlife.

Uses

Horticulture
Although not of great horticultural value, it is a hardy plant and is useful as a screening plant in dry areas.

Essential oils
Of the three forms, subspecies mutica has the most oil in the leaves. It consists mostly of monoterpenoids, especially 1,8-cineole (eucalyptol).

References

Flora of Western Australia
pauperiflora
Myrtales of Australia
Plants described in 1862
Taxa named by Ferdinand von Mueller